The 2016–17 Danish 2nd Divisions was divided in three groups of eight teams in the autumn. In spring there was a promotion play-off and a relegation play-off. The top two teams of the promotion play-off group were promoted to the 2017–18 Danish 1st Division.

IK Skovbakken merged with Vejlby IK as of 1 July 2016 to form VSK Aarhus.

Participants

Group 1

League table

Group 2

League table

Group 3

League table

Promotion Group

League table 
The top 4 teams from each group competed for 2 spots in the 2017–18 Danish 1st Division. The points and goals that the teams won in the autumn group against other participants in the promotion group were transferred to the promotion group.

Relegation Group

League table 
The bottom 4 teams from each group competed to avoid the 4 relegations spots to the Denmark Series. The points and goals that the teams won in the autumn group against other participants in the relegation group were transferred to the relegation group.

References

3
Danish 2nd Divisions
Danish 2nd Division seasons
2016–17 in Danish football leagues